Mickael Luis Oliveira Barroso (born February 5, 1992 in São Luís, Brazil) is a Brazilian footballer.

Career
Oliveira played for USL Pro side Wilmington Hammerheads before the club released him in July 2014.

He is the son of former Belgian International, and former player of R.S.C. Anderlecht, Cagliari Calcio,  ACF Fiorentina and Bologna F.C. 1909, Luis Oliveira.

References

External links
 USL profile

1992 births
Living people
Brazilian footballers
Belgian footballers
Brazilian emigrants to Belgium
Belgian people of Brazilian descent
Wilmington Hammerheads FC players
Brazilian expatriate footballers
Expatriate soccer players in the United States
USL Championship players
Association football forwards
People from São Luís, Maranhão
Sportspeople from Maranhão